VF-92 may refer to:

 VF-74, a USN fighter squadron which was designated VF-92 from 1948 to 1951 before becoming VF-74.
 VF-92 (1952-1974), USN fighter squadron active from 1952 to 1974